Lorca Fútbol Club was a Spanish football team based in Lorca, in the autonomous community of the Region of Murcia. Founded in 2003, it last played in Preferente Autonómica de Murcia – Group 1, holding home games at Estadio Francisco Artés Carrasco, which has a capacity of 8,120.

History

The club was founded in 2003 as La Hoya Deportiva Club de Fútbol by constructor Pedro Rosell, whose enterprise sponsored the team in its first years.

In 2010, the club changes its name to La Hoya Lorca Club de Fútbol in 2010, after the promotion of the club to Tercera División, but continues playing in La Hoya. Rossell resigned as president and Luis Jiménez replaced him. During these years, the team was nicknamed as El Brócoli Mecánico (The Clockwork Broccoli) after the vegetable, a major local export. In 2011, La Hoya Lorca started playing its games at Estadio Francisco Artés Carrasco in Lorca.

In 2013, La Hoya Lorca won promotion to Segunda División B via the play-offs, defeating SCR Peña Deportiva on away goals after a 4–4 aggregate draw. The club previously finished the Copa Federación de España as runner-up, in the club's first success in national football.

In successive seasons, the club attracted attention for their kit which had broccoli imprinted over the entire shirt and shorts.

On 8 July 2016, the club changed its name to Lorca Fútbol Club when it was bought by former Chinese international player and manager Xu Genbao. When Lorca played FC Jumilla in November 2016 the match was broadcast live over the internet in China as Jumilla are also under Chinese ownership.

On 27 May 2017, the club achieved promotion to Segunda División after a 0–0 away draw against Albacete Balompié in the play-offs (1–1 on aggregate). Three weeks later, rumours about a possible transfer of the club started to appear. Xu Genbao supposedly would sell the club and its place in the second division for €9 million and the owner of Hércules CF would be interested in refounding the club from this one, as his own had serious financial trouble.

In the 2017–18 season, Lorca were relegated with 33 points in 42 matches. During the summer, the Royal Spanish Football Federation announced that the team would be banned for playing in the third tier the following season for not meeting the economic requirements.

In the 2018–19 season the club finished 3rd in Tercera División, Group 18 with 80 points.

Club background
La Hoya Deportiva Club de Fútbol: (2003–2010)
La Hoya Lorca Club de Fútbol: (2010–2016)
La Hoya Lorca Club de Fútbol, S.A.D.: (2016–2017)
Lorca Fútbol Club, S.A.D.: (2017–present)

Season to season
As La Hoya Deportiva

As La Hoya Lorca

As Lorca FC

1 season in Segunda División
4 seasons in Segunda División B
6 seasons in Tercera División

Honours
Segunda División B
Champions (1): 2016–17
Tercera División
Champions (1): 2012–13

Notable players

The following Lorca player(s) have been capped at full international level. Years in brackets indicate their spells at the club.
 Federico Bikoro (2018)
 Ishan Pandita (2019–2020)

See also
Lorca FC B (reserve team)
List of Lorca FC players

References

External links
Official website
Futbolme.com profile 
La futbolteca team profile 

Lorca FC
Football clubs in the Region of Murcia
Association football clubs established in 2003
2003 establishments in Spain
Lorca, Spain
Segunda División clubs